Gallbladder cancer is a relatively uncommon cancer, with an incidence of fewer than 2 cases per 100,000 people per year in the United States. It is particularly common in central and South America, central and eastern Europe, Japan and northern India; it is also common in certain ethnic groups e.g. Native American Indians and Hispanics. If it is diagnosed early enough, it can be cured by removing the gallbladder, part of the liver and associated lymph nodes. Most often it is found after symptoms such as abdominal pain, jaundice and vomiting occur, and it has spread to other organs such as the liver.

It is a rare cancer that is thought to be related to gallstones building up, which also can lead to calcification of the gallbladder, a condition known as porcelain gallbladder. Porcelain gallbladder is also rare. Some studies indicate that people with porcelain gallbladder have a high risk of developing gallbladder cancer, but other studies question this. The outlook is poor for recovery if the cancer is found after symptoms have started to occur, with a 5-year survival rate of close to 3%.

Signs and symptoms
 Steady pain in the upper right abdomen
 Indigestion
 Dyspepsia (gas)
 Bilious vomit
 Weakness
 Loss of appetite
 Weight loss
 Jaundice and vomiting due to obstruction

Early symptoms mimic gallbladder inflammation due to gallstones. Later, the symptoms may be that of biliary and stomach obstruction.

Of note, Courvoisier's law states that in the presence of a palpably enlarged gallbladder which is nontender and accompanied with mild painless jaundice, the cause is unlikely to be gallstones. This implicates possible malignancy of the gallbladder or pancreas, and the swelling is unlikely due to gallstones due to the chronic inflammation associated with gallstones leading to a shrunken, non-distensible gallbladder. However, Ludwig Georg Courvoisier's original observations, published in Germany in 1890, were not originally cited as a law, and no mention of malignancy or pain (tenderness) was made. These points are commonly misquoted or confused in the medical literature.

Risk factors
 Gender— approximately twice as common in women than men, usually in seventh and eighth decades
 Obesity
 Chronic cholecystitis and cholelithiasis
 Primary sclerosing cholangitis
 Chronic typhoid infection of gallbladder; chronic Salmonella typhi carriers have 3 to 200 times higher risk of gallbladder cancer than non-carriers and 1–6% lifetime risk of development of cancer
 Various single nucleotide polymorphisms (SNPs) have been shown to be associated with gallbladder cancer; however, existing genetic studies in GBC susceptibility have so far been insufficient to confirm any association
 Gallbladder polyps
 Calcified gallbladder wall (porcelain gallbladder)
 Congenital abnormalities of the bile duct such as choledochal cyst

Diagnosis
Early diagnosis is not generally possible. People at high risk, such as women or Native Americans with gallstones, are evaluated closely. Transabdominal ultrasound, CT scan, endoscopic ultrasound, MRI, and MR cholangio-pancreatography (MRCP) can be used for diagnosis. A large number of gallbladder cancers are found incidentally in patients being evaluated for cholelithiasis, or gallstone formation, which is far more common. A biopsy is the only certain way to tell whether or not the tumorous growth is malignant.

Differential diagnosis
Xanthogranulomatous cholecystitis (XGC) is a rare form of gallbladder disease which mimics gallbladder cancer although it is not cancerous. It was first discovered and reported in the medical literature in 1976 by J.J. McCoy Jr., and colleagues.

Treatment
If detected early in a stage where it has not spread, gallbladder cancer can be treated by surgery. Surgery for gallbladder cancer is called radical cholecystectomy or extended cholecystectomy.
It entails the removal of gallbladder along with adequate removal of its liver bed to the healthy tissue. The lymph nodes in the vicinity are also removed. Sometimes removal of a large part of the liver called hepatectomy is required to completely remove the tumor. The bile duct if involved also needs to be removed. However, with gallbladder cancer's extremely poor prognosis, most patients will die within a year of surgery. If surgery is not possible, endoscopic stenting or percutaneous transhepatic biliary drainage (PTBD) of the biliary tree can reduce jaundice and a stent in the stomach may relieve vomiting. Chemotherapy and radiation may also be used with surgery. If gallbladder cancer is diagnosed after cholecystectomy for stone disease (incidental cancer), re-operation to remove part of liver and lymph nodes is required in most cases. When it is done as early as possible, patients have the best chance of long-term survival and even cure.

Epidemiology
Most tumors are adenocarcinomas, with a small percent being squamous cell carcinomas.
 Gallbladder cancer is relatively rare, affecting fewer than 5000 people in the United States per year
 Gallbladder cancer is more common in South American countries, Japan, and Israel; in Chile, gallbladder cancer is the fourth most common cause of cancer deaths.
 5th most common gastrointestinal cancer
 Up to 5 times more common in women than men depending on population (e.g. 73% female in China) 
 The age adjusted incidence rates of gallbladder cancer is highest in Chile, followed by in the state of Assam in India

Prognosis
The prognosis still remains poor. The cancer commonly spreads to the liver, bile duct, stomach, and duodenum.

Research

A better understanding of the biology of biliary tract cancers, including gallbladder cancer, is being achieved by advances in genomic profiling.  This research is providing insight into deficiencies in the tumor cell’s ability to accurately repair damages in their own DNA.  The tumors in about 25% of patients with biliary tract cancer have some form of DNA damage repair deficiency.  Knowledge of such deficiencies can be exploited to potentially increase response to treatment strategies that are currently available such as chemotherapy, radiotherapy or immunotherapy.

References

External links 
 U.S. National Cancer Institute Gallbladder Cancer Treatment (www.cancer.gov)

Digestive system neoplasia
Gallbladder disorders
Articles containing video clips
Types of cancer